Afrospilarctia lucida is a moth of the family Erebidae. It was described by Herbert Druce in 1898. It is found in Angola, Ethiopia, Kenya, Rwanda, Tanzania, Uganda and Zimbabwe.

References

Spilosomina
Moths described in 1898
Moths of Africa